Astragalus bicristatus is a species of milkvetch known by the common names crested milkvetch and two-crested milkvetch. It is endemic to southern California, where it grows in the coniferous forests of the San Gabriel and San Bernardino Mountains of the Transverse Ranges.

Description
Astragalus bicristatus is a perennial herb sprawling outwards with stems to a maximum length approaching half a meter. The leaves are up to 14 centimeters long and are made up of very widely spaced narrow linear leaflets. The stems and foliage have sparse grayish hairs, giving them a rough texture. The inflorescence is a loose array of up to 20 pealike flowers. Each flower is between 1 and 2 centimeters long and is purple-tinted white to light greenish yellow.

The fruit is a hanging capsule 2 to 4 centimeters long and curved or crescent-shaped. It is fleshy when immature and leathery to woody when dried.

References

External links
Jepson Manual Treatment — Astragalus bicristatus
The Nature Conservancy
USDA Plants Profile
Astragalus bicristatus — U.C. Photo gallery

bicristatus
Endemic flora of California
Natural history of the Transverse Ranges
~
~
Natural history of San Bernardino County, California